Katonaia arushae is a species of tephritid or fruit flies in the genus Katonaia of the family Tephritidae.

Distribution
Kenya, Tanzania, Ethiopia.

References

Tephritinae
Insects described in 1935
Diptera of Africa